James Whitehouse (19 September 1924 – 2005) was an English footballer who played in the Football League for Carlisle United, Rochdale, Walsall and West Bromwich Albion.

References

English footballers
English Football League players
1924 births
2005 deaths
West Bromwich Albion F.C. players
Walsall F.C. players
Rochdale A.F.C. players
Carlisle United F.C. players
Association football forwards